Great Britain is a satirical play written by Richard Bean. It received its world premiere at the Royal National Theatre, London on 30 June 2014, before transferring to the West End's Theatre Royal Haymarket.

Production history
Great Britain is written by English playwright Richard Bean. In May 2013, it was revealed Bean was working on a new play based on the phone hacking scandal, having been commissioned by National Theatre artistic director Sir Nicholas Hytner, whilst still working on his play One Man, Two Guvnors. Speaking about the play he revealed that it would be set in a tabloid newsroom and is a play about the state-of-the-nation, press, politics and police in bed with each other. In March 2014, it was revealed that an undisclosed Bean play would premiere as part of the National Theatre 2014-15 season, Hytner's last as the National's artistic director. In May 2014, it was revealed that Billie Piper and Oliver Chris were taking part in workshops for the play and that the cast and crew had signed non-disclosure agreements for the as yet untitled production.

On 25 June 2014, the play was officially announced as Great Britain and that it would premiere without a preview period on 30 June, at the National Theatre's Lyttelton Theatre. It is a satire about the press, police and politics, and stars Billie Piper as a newspaper editor, Paige Britain. The play is directed by Nicholas Hytner, with design by Tim Hatley, lighting design by Neil Austin, video design by Leo Warner, music by Grant Olding, sound design by Paul Arditti and Clive Coleman acting as a story consultant. The launch was slightly delayed by concerns over legal issues which might have been caused by running at the same time as R v Coulson, Brooks and others.

Following its premiere production the play transferred to the West End's Theatre Royal Haymarket on 9 September 2014, with its official opening night coming on 26 September, booking until 10 January 2015. The transfer was announced only one day after opening at the national. Lucy Punch took over the role of Paige Britain and Ben Mansfield replaced Oliver Chris as Asst. Commissioner Donald Doyle Davidson for the West End Run, due to prior commitments. The play was reworked for its West End debut, with around twenty minutes cut from the running time.

Principal roles and original cast

External links

References

2014 plays
Plays by Richard Bean
News International phone hacking scandal
West End plays